Reversed Ze (Ԑ ԑ; italics: Ԑ ԑ) is a letter of the Cyrillic script. Its form is a reversed Cyrillic letter Ze (З з З з). It resembles the Latin letter epsilon (Ɛ ɛ) and the Greek letter Epsilon (Ε ε), as well as a hand-written form of the uppercase Latin E and Cyrillic letter Ye, but has different origins from them. Reversed Ze was added to the Unicode 5.0 Standard, but is still uncommon in most Cyrillic fonts.

Reversed Ze is used in Enets. In Enets, it represents . It was thought to have been used in the Khanty language, but there is no proof supporting that 'Ԑ' was used.

Computing codes

See also 
Cyrillic characters in Unicode

References

Cyrillic letters